Natural Light is a Hungarian-French-German drama film written and directed by Dénes Nagy, based on the novel Természetes fény by Pál Závada. The film stars Ferenc Szabó, László Bajkó, Tamás Garbacz and Gyula Franczia.

The film had its worldwide premiere at the 71st Berlin International Film Festival in March 2021, where it won the Silver Bear for Best Director.

Plot
The plot takes places during the second World War and shows the war through the eyes of one character, taken from the novel.

Cast
The cast include:
 Ferenc Szabó as Semetka
 Tamás Garbacz as Szrnka
 László Bajkó as Koleszár
 Gyula Franczia as Major
 Ernő Stuhl as Vucskán
 Gyula Szilágyi as Csorin
 Mareks Lapeskis as Mihail
 Krisztián Kozó as Kozó
 Csaba Nánási as Nánási
 Zsolt Fodor as Fodor

Release
On February 11, 2021, Berlinale announced that the film would have its worldwide premiere at the 71st Berlin International Film Festival in the Berlinale Competition section, in March 2021.

References

External links
 

Hungarian drama films
French drama films
German drama films
2021 drama films
2020s French films